Mbessa (Mbesa) is a Ring language spoken in Cameroon, neighboring Kom, Oku language, Noni language. Mbessa is the language of the people of Mbessa Kingdom (Fondom) in Boyo Division in the Anglophone North-West Region of Cameroon.

References

Ring languages
Languages of Cameroon